The following is a list of present and past spokespersons for the Green Party of Aotearoa New Zealand according to their terms and their portfolios.

Frontbench teams

2020–present
The following is the Green frontbench in the 53rd Parliament.

2017–2020
The following is the Green frontbench in the 52nd Parliament.

2014–2017
The following is the Green frontbench in the 51st Parliament.

2011–2014
The following is the Green frontbench in the 50th Parliament.

2008–2011
The following is the Green frontbench in the 49th Parliament.

2005–2008
The following is the Green frontbench in the 48th Parliament.

2002–2005
The following is the Green frontbench in the 47th Parliament.

1999–2002
The following is the Green frontbench in the 46th Parliament.

References

Green Party of Aotearoa New Zealand
New Zealand shadow cabinets